Phlegon of Tralles ( Flegon o Trallianos) was a Greek writer and freedman of the emperor Hadrian, who lived in the 2nd century AD.

Works
His chief work was the Olympiads, an historical compendium in sixteen books, from the 1st down to the 229th Olympiad (776 BC to AD 137), of which several chapters are preserved in Eusebius' Chronicle, Photius, and George Syncellus.

Two short works by him are extant. On Marvels consists of "anecdotes culled from sources as diverse as the Greek poet Hesiod and the Roman natural historian Pliny the Elder. Each... recounts a fantastical or paranormal event." On Long-Lived Persons contains a list of Italians who had passed the age of 100, taken from the censuses of the Roman Empire.
 
Other works ascribed to Phlegon in the Suda are a description of Sicily, a work on the Roman festivals in three books, and a topography of Rome:

"Phlegon of Tralles, freedman of Augustus Caesar, but some say of Hadrian: historian. He wrote Olympiads in 16 books. Up to the 229th Olympiad they contain what was done everywhere. And these in 8 books: Description of Sicily; On long-lived and marvelous persons, On the feasts of the Romans 3 books, On the places in Rome and by what names they are called, Epitome of Olympic victors in 2 books, and other things.

"Of this Phlegon, as Philostorgius says, to relate fully in detail what befell with the Jews, while Phlegon and Dio mentioned [these events] briefly and made them an appendix to their own narrative. Since this man does not exhibit at all prudently those who would lead to piety and other virtues, as those others do not either. Josephus, on the contrary, is like one who fears and takes care not to offend the [sc.pagan] Greeks."

Reference to Jesus
Origen of Alexandria (182-254 AD), in Against Celsus (Book II, Chap. XIV), wrote that Phlegon, in his Chronicles, mentions Jesus: "Now Phlegon, in the thirteenth or fourteenth book, I think, of his Chronicles, not only ascribed to Jesus a knowledge of future events (although falling into confusion about some things which refer to Peter, as if they referred to Jesus), but also testified that the result corresponded to His predictions." He referred to a description by Phlegon of an eclipse accompanied by earthquakes during the reign of Tiberius: that there was "the greatest eclipse of the sun" and that "it became night in the sixth hour of the day [i. e., noon] so that stars even appeared in the heavens. There was a great earthquake in Bithynia, and many things were overturned in Nicaea." 

However, Eusebius, in book 2 of Chronicle (Chronicon, quoted by Jerome), actually quotes Phlegon, with no mention of Jesus or a three hour darkness.

"In the 4th year of the 202nd Olympiad, there was a great eclipse of the Sun, greater than had ever been known before, for at the sixth hour the day was changed into night, and the stars were seen in the heavens. An earthquake occurred in Bythinia and overthrew a great part of the city of Nicæa."

Phlegon may have been recording an eclipse that happened in November, 29 AD, the 1st year of the 202nd Olympiad.

References

Bibliography
Karl Wilhelm Ludwig Müller, Frag. hist. graec., iii
Otto Keller, Rerum naturalium scriptores, i. (1877)
H Diels, "Phlegons Androgynenorakel" in Sibyllinische Bücher (1890).
Phlegon of Tralles' Book of Marvels. Translated with an introduction and commentary by William Hansen. University of Exeter Press (1996) pp.xvi + 215. Review.

External links
Photius, "Bibliotheca" codex 97 - the entry on Phlegon's Chronicles and List of Olympic Victors.
The Suda entry for Phlegon - Greek, English and commentary.
Fragments of Phlegon on the passion phenomena - Greek/Latin and English.
 William Smith, "Dictionary of Greek and Roman Biography and Mythology" (1870) v. 3, page 336 - bitmap and scanned text with list of works

Ancient Greek writers
2nd-century Greek people
2nd-century Romans
2nd-century writers
Historians from Roman Anatolia
Emperor's slaves and freedmen
Ancient Olympic Games
People from Tralles